The SPL Vaasan piiri (Vaasa Football Association) is one of the 12 district organisations of the Football Association of Finland. It administers lower tier football in Vaasa.

Background 

Suomen Palloliitto Vaasan piiri, commonly referred to as SPL Vaasan piiri or SPL Vaasa, is the governing body for football in Vaasa.  Based in the city of Vaasa, the Association's Chairman is Stig Nygård.

Member clubs

League Competitions 

SPL Vaasan piiri run the following league competitions:

Men's Football
 Division 3 - Kolmonen  -  one section
 Division 4 - Nelonen  -  one section
 Division 5 - Vitonen  -  one section
 Division 6 - Kutonen  -  three sections

Ladies Football
 Division 3 - Kolmonen  -  one section

Footnotes

References

External links 
 SPL Vaasan piiri Official Website 

V